Ahl al-Kisa, also known as the Aal al-Aba, are the Islamic prophet Muhammad, his daughter Fatima, his cousin and son-in-law Ali, and his two grandsons Hasan and Husayn. The name has its origins in the Hadith of Kisa and the Event of Mubahala, both widely reported by Sunni and Shia authorities. While all Muslims revere the family of Muhammad, it is the (non-Zaydi) Shia who regard the Ahl al-Kisa as infallible and believe in the redemptive power of their pain and martyrdom, particularly Husayn's. In Shia Islam, the Ahl al-Bayt of Muhammad is limited to the Ahl al-Kisa. A common Sunni view also includes Muhammad's wives, though there are other Sunni opinions too about the Ahl al-Bayt.

Origins of the name

Hadith of Kisa 
Muhammad's wife Umm Salama relates in possibly the earliest version of the Hadith al-Kisa that Muhammad gathered Ali, Fatima, Hasan, and Husayn under his cloak, and these five are thus known as the Ahl al-Kisa. The hadith continues that Muhammad prayed, "O God, these are my  and my closest family members; remove defilement from them and purify them completely," thus making a reference to verse 33:33 of the Quran, known also as the Verse of Purification. Among others, this hadith is reported by the Sunni Ibn Kathir and al-Suyuti and the Shia Tabatabai.

Event of Mubahala 
This is when Muhammad is reported to have received verse 3:61 of the Quran, also known as the Verse of Mubahala, which reads

This view is shared by Madelung and Lalani. Momen and Algar add that these five stood under Muhammad's cloak, hence the name Ahl al-Kisa. In contrast, most Sunni accounts by al-Tabari do not name the participants of the event.

Place in Islam

In the Quran 

Families and descendants of the past prophets hold a prominent position in the Quran. In particular, after the past prophets, their descendants become spiritual and material heirs to keep their fathers' covenants intact. Jafri further suggests that the sanctity of a prophet's family was an accepted principle at the time of Muhammad, while Madelung believes that Muhammad's kin are mentioned in the Quran in various contexts.

Verse of Mubahala 
A similar view is voiced by Lalani. In its Shia interpretation, the Verse of Mubahala refers to Ali as the self of Muhammad and thus the former enjoys the same authority as the prophet.

Verse of Purification 
The last passage of verse 33:33, also known as the Verse of Purification, reads:Muslims disagree as to who belongs to the Ahl al-Bayt and what political privileges or responsibilities they have. Shia Islam limits the Ahl al-Bayt to the Ahl al-Kisa, namely, Muhammad, Fatima, Ali, Hasan and Husayn. The Verse of Purification is thus regarded in Shia Islam as evidence of the infallibility of the Ahl al-Bayt. There are various views in Sunni Islam, though a typical compromise is to also include Muhammad's wives in the Ahl al-Bayt.

In particular, the majority of the traditions quoted by al-Tabari in his exegesis identify the Ahl al-Bayt in the Verse of Purification with the Ahl al-Kisa. These traditions are also cited by some other early Sunni authorities, including Ahmad ibn Hanbal, al-Suyuti, al-Hafiz al-Kabir, and Ibn Kathir. Similarly, the canonical Sunni collection Sunnan al-Tirmidhi reports that Muhammad limited the Ahl al-Bayt to Ali, Fatima, and their two sons when the Verse of Purification was revealed to him. Veccia Vaglieri writes that Muhammad recited the last passage of the Verse of Purification every morning when he passed by Fatima's house to remind her household of the  prayer. At the Event of Mubahala, Muhammad defined the Ahl al-Bayt as Ali, Fatima, and their two sons, according to Shia and some Sunni sources, including the canonical Sahih Muslim and Sunan al-Tirmidhi.

Verse of Mawadda 
Verse 42:23 of the Quran, also known as the Verse of Mawadda, includes the passage

The word kinsfolk in this verse is interpreted by the Shia as the Ahl al-Bayt. Ibn Ishaq narrates that the prophet specified  as his daughter Fatima, her husband Ali, and their two sons, Hasan and Husayn. As quoted by Madelung, Hasan ibn Ali referred to the Verse of Mawadda in his inaugural speech as the caliph after the assassination of his father in 661, saying that he belonged to the Ahl al-Bayt "whose love He [God] has made obligatory in His Book [Quran]..."

The Verse of Mawadda is often cited by the Shia about the elevated status of the Ahl al-Bayt. In Twelver Shia, the affection in this verse also entails obedience to the Ahl al-Bayt as the source of exoteric and esoteric guidance. This obedience is believed to benefit the faithful first and foremost, citing the following passage of verse 34:47, which contains the passage, "Say, 'I ask not of you any reward; that shall be yours.'"

Some Sunni commentators agree with the Shia view, including Baydawi, al-Razi, and Ibn Maghazili. Most Sunni authors, however, reject the Shia view and offer various alternatives. The view preferred by al-Tabari is that the Verse of Mawadda instructs Muslims to love the prophet because of their blood relations to him. Alternatively, Madelung suggests that the Verse of Mawadda demands love towards relatives in general.

In the hadith literature 
Widely reported by Sunni and Shia authorities is the Hadith al-Thaqalayn. In particular, the version of this hadith that appears in Musnad Ibn Hanbal, a canonical Sunni source, is as follows:There are several slightly different versions of this hadith in Sunni sources, suggesting that Muhammad might have repeated this statement on multiple occasions. In particular, the version that appears in as-Sunan al-kubra, another canonical Sunni source, also includes the warning, "Be careful how you treat the two [treasures] after me."

Another instance is the Hadith of the Ark, attributed to Muhammad and reported by Shia and Sunni sources in various forms, according to Momen. One version of the Hadith of the Ark reads, "The likeness of the people of my house is the ship of Noah: whoever boards it is safe, and whoever abandons it is drowned." Also ascribed to Muhammad is the hadith, "By Him in Whose Hand is my soul, faith will never enter a person's heart until he loves them [Muhammad's family] for the sake of God and for the fact that they are my kin."

In Muslim communities 

In many Muslim communities, high social status is given to people claiming descent from Ali and Fatima. They are called s or s. Campo writes that Sunnis revere the family of Muhammad, though Brunner suggests that this was the case until modern times. Most Sufi s (brotherhoods) trace their spiritual chain to Muhammad through Ali and revere the Ahl al-Kisa as the Holy Five. It is, however, the (non-Zaydi) Shia who regard the Ahl al-Kisa as infallible and believe in the redemptive power of their pain and martyrdom (particularly Husayn's) for those who empathize with their suffering and divine cause.

See also
 Ahl al-Bayt
 Hadith al-Thaqalayn
 Hadith of Pen and Paper
 Hadith of the Twelve Successors
 Sayyidat Nisa' al-Alamin

Notes

Sources

External links
 Hadees-e-Kisa
 Ayat ut Tathir
 Hadis-e-Kisa
 The Event of Cloak (Hadith Al-Kisa)

Fatimah
Hadith

Islamic terminology